Indrajit Tangi ( – 2 November 2019) was an Indian teacher and politician belonging to the Communist Party of India. He was a legislator of the West Bengal Legislative Assembly.

Biography
Tangi was a primary school teacher and politician. He was elected as a legislator of the West Bengal Legislative Assembly from Indpur in 2006. He died on 2 November 2019 at the age of 75.

References

Indian schoolteachers
1940s births
2019 deaths
West Bengal MLAs 2006–2011
Communist Party of India politicians from West Bengal
People from Bankura district